Highways & Heartaches is the fourth studio album by American country music artist Wade Hayes. His final studio album and his only album for Monument Records, it produced the minor singles "Up North (Down South, Back East, Out West)" and "Goodbye Is the Wrong Way to Go", which peaked at #48 and #45, respectively, on the Billboard Hot Country Singles & Tracks (now Hot Country Songs) charts.

After this album's release, Hayes and fiddler Mark McClurg, under the name McHayes, recorded an album entitled Lessons in Lonely. It was not released, but its lead-off single charted at #41 on the country charts.

Track listing
"Up North (Down South, Back East, Out West)" (Jill Wood, Danny Wells) – 3:41
"Life After Lovin' You" (Billy Burnette, Brett Beavers) – 3:45
"Goodbye Is the Wrong Way to Go" (Shawn Camp, Will Smith) – 3:21
"What's It Gonna Take" (John Rich, John Barlow Jarvis) – 3:13
"She Used to Say that to Me" (Jim Lauderdale, John Scott Sherrill) – 2:44
"Up and Down" (Terry McBride, Marv Green) – 3:19
"You Just Keep On" (Camp, Herb McCullough, Taylor Dunn) – 3:49
"That's What Honky Tonks Are For" (Don Cook, Chick Rains) – 2:45
"You Were, You Are, You'll Always Be" (Lewis Anderson, George Teren) – 3:16
"I'm Lonesome Too" (Camp, Gary Scruggs) – 5:38

Personnel
Bruce Bouton - steel guitar, keyboards
Mark Casstevens - acoustic guitar
Chad Cromwell - drums, percussion
Paul Franklin - electric guitar, steel guitar, slide guitar
Sonny Garrish - steel guitar
Rob Hajacos - fiddle, mandolin, "assorted hoedown tools"
Wade Hayes - electric guitar, lead vocals, background vocals 
Aubrey Haynie - fiddle, mandolin, "assorted hoedown tools"
John Hobbs - keyboards 
John Barlow Jarvis - organ, piano
Chris Leuzinger - electric guitar
Liana Manis - background vocals 
Brent Mason - electric guitar
Michael Rhodes - bass guitar
John Wesley Ryles - background vocals
Brian Siewart - string arrangements 
Biff Watson - acoustic guitar
Dennis Wilson - background vocals
Lonnie Wilson - drums, percussion 
Glenn Worf - bass guitar
Reese Wynans - organ, piano

Chart performance

References
Allmusic (see infobox)

2000 albums
Wade Hayes albums
Monument Records albums
Albums produced by Don Cook